KGHY is a radio station airing a Southern Gospel Music format licensed to Beaumont, Texas, broadcasting on 88.5 FM.  The station serves the Beaumont – Port Arthur - Orange metropolitan area and southwestern Louisiana. KGHY is owned by CCS Radio, Inc.

KGHY relays its programming on two additional translators, W243EQ Lake Charles, and K288FY Livingston, extending the overall KGHY coverage area into areas north of the main signal.

References

External links

Southern Gospel radio stations in the United States
GHY